Haqqani Anjuman (Hindi: हक़्क़ानी अंजुमन; Bengali:হাক্কানী আঞ্জুমান ; Urdu:حقانی انجمن ; Tamil : ஹக்கானி அஞ்சுமான் ; Telugu : హక్కాని అంజుమన్ ; Gujrati : હક્કાની અંજુમન ; Russian : Хаккани Анджуман ; Chinese : 哈卡尼安朱曼 Kannada : ಹಕ್ಕಾನಿ ಅಂಜುಮನ್ ; Malayalam: ഹഖാനി അൻജുമൻ) established in 1876 by Maulana Sufi Mufti Azangachhi Shaheb, is an Islamic non-governmental organisation in Bangladesh with head office in Bagmari,  Kolkata, West Bengal,  in India. The organisation is influenced by Sufism and is associated with social work.

The literal meaning of Haqqani Anjuman is the organization of truth.

See also
 Sufism in India
 Spiritual practice

References

External links
 Greeting Messages by President of Bangladesh Zillur Rahman on the occasion of Program organised by Haqqani Anjuman in Dhaka as on 1 Dec, 2012.

 
Islamic organisations based in India
Sufi orders